The Untold Truth is the only studio album by American rap duo Illegal, composed of rappers Jamal and Mr. Malik. It was released on August 24, 1993 through Rowdy Records with distribution via Arista Records. Recording sessions took place from late Fall 1992 to mid-Summer 1993 at D.A.R.P. Studios in Atlanta, at Soundtrack Studios in New York City and at BMV Digital Studios in Newark. Production was handled by nine record producers, including Dallas Austin, Diamond D, Erick Sermon, Biz Markie and Lord Finesse.

The album peaked at #119 on the Billboard 200 and #19 on the Top R&B/Hip-Hop Albums. It spawned three singles: "Back in the Day", and the Kris Kross/Da Youngsta's diss tracks "Head or Gut" and "We Getz Busy".

Track listing

Personnel
Jamal Phillips – vocals
Malik Edwards – vocals
Joseph Kirkland – vocals (track 4), producer (tracks: 2, 4)
Erick Sermon – vocals (track 5), producer (tracks: 3, 5)
Robert Hall Jr. – vocals & producer (track 8)
Andre Barnes – vocals (track 8)
Colin Wolfe – producer (tracks: 1, 6)
Dallas Austin – producer (tracks: 7, 9), executive producer
Xavier Hargrove – producer (tracks: 10, 11)
Melvin "E-Locc" Davis – producer (track 11)
Marcel Theo Hall – producer (track 12)
Vaughan Lee – producer (track 12)
Alvin Speights – mixing & recording (tracks: 1, 2, 6, 7, 9)
George Pappas – mixing & recording (tracks: 1, 10)
Gregory Mann – mixing & recording (tracks: 3, 10)
John Lawrence Byas – mixing & recording (track 4)
Darin Prindle – mixing & recording (track 5)
Troy Hightower – mixing & recording (track 8)
Everett "Bizz-E" Ramos – mixing & recording (track 12)
José L. Rodriguez – mastering
Christopher Stern – art direction
Danny Clinch – photography

Charts

References

External links

1993 debut albums
Jamal (rapper) albums
Arista Records albums
Albums produced by Diamond D
Albums produced by Erick Sermon
Albums produced by Lord Finesse
Albums produced by Dallas Austin